State Street–Division Street Historic District is a national historic district located at Elkhart, Elkhart County, Indiana. The district encompasses 109 contributing buildings and two contributing structures in a predominantly residential section of Elkhart.  It was developed between about 1868 and 1930, and includes notable examples of Italianate and Queen Anne-style architecture.

It was added to the National Register of Historic Places in 1999.

References

Historic districts on the National Register of Historic Places in Indiana
Italianate architecture in Indiana
Queen Anne architecture in Indiana
Buildings and structures in Elkhart, Indiana
Historic districts in Elkhart County, Indiana
National Register of Historic Places in Elkhart County, Indiana